Tibba Shah Behlol is a town of Pindi Bhattian on Chiniot-Lahore road. It is located at the coordinates 31.8450 N and 73.2104 E. It is very famous town for the Sheikh Behlol Daryai and it is built on His name.

Tibba is some place that is somewhat above from the ground level the name Tibba Shah Bahlol is ascribed to a great sufi master Sheikh Bahlol Qadri ( d. 983AH/ 1575) as he aboded the place  and his shrine is located in the same place .

Some life biography of the saint is necessary to know why and how the name of the place was coined after his name. 

A very historical book Haqiqat ul Fuqara ( for reference please read the book on www.rekhta.org) written by Sheikh Syed Mahmood Aka. Syed Muhammad pir ( written in 1072AH/ 1666)  gives us a short but detailed biography of the famous saint Sheikh Bahlol Qadri Hanafi.
Populated places in Hafizabad District
Hafizabad District